Kalmar Fotbollförening, more commonly known as Kalmar FF, is a Swedish professional football club based in Kalmar. The club is affiliated to Smålands Fotbollförbund and play their home games at Guldfågeln Arena. Formed on 15 June 1910, the club have won one national championship title (2008) and three national cup titles (1981, 1987, and 2007).

In total, KFF has made 35 seasons in Allsvenskan since the debut in the 1949. The club can be found at the 13th position in the all-time Allsvenskan standings, is one of 14 Swedish football clubs that have become both national champions and national cup champions, and one of 14 clubs that have always played in one of the three highest Swedish national football leagues.

Kalmar FF's main local rivals are Östers IF and during the 1980s and 90s Kalmar AIK.

History

In the beginning

On 15 June 1910, the club IF Göta was created, however they were not allowed to enter the Riksidrottsförbundet due to a conflict regarding the name. The name was already taken by Stockholm's-Göta and Karlstads-Göta. Later in 1912 the club changed its name to IF Gothia and was then accepted by Riksidrottsförbundet.

In 1918 Fredriksskans was opened and at the same time there was a major conference in Kalmar about the high number of clubs in the town, this led to the merging of IF Gothia and Kamraterna to Kalmar Idrotts Sällskap and Kalmar IK merged with Falken to form Kalmar AIK. In 1927 Kalmar Idrotts Sällskap changed its name to Kalmar FF.

In 1927–1928 they qualified for the local league in the Swedish league system, IFK Oskarshamn won the league and was moved up to the Southswedish league, covering both Småland and Skåne, however IFK Oskarshamn renounced its position and it was given to Kalmar FF, this gave rise to complaint from the clubs in Skåne since there were no good train connections to Kalmar at that time, however SJ solved it. In their first game they defeated Malmö FF with 6–0.

The middle years

In 1949 the club reached Allsvenskan for the first time after defeating Halmstads BK in the decisive game of the season; during this time Swedish leagues were played autumn–spring, on 31 July they played their first game in Allsvenskan against Degerfors IF and lost 2–0, afterward, the later world-famous Gunnar Nordahl claimed that he had seen much worse newcomers, also this year, on 4 September Kalmar faced Malmö FF in front of 15 093 people in the audience; this is still the audience record on Fredriksskans.

Between 1950 and 1955 the club went up and down between Allsvenskan and Division 2. In 1955 they fell down to Division 2 and stayed there for 20 years; during this time players like Hungarian Ference Marko represented the club at the same time as he lived at the refugee camp in Borgholm in 1957, in 1959 Sune "Mona-Lisa" Andersson, who won an Olympic medal in the 1948 Summer Olympics as a player, as manager, during this time Sten-Åke Johansson played for the club and became the top goalscorer for all time for the club, on 19 October 1975 Kalmar FF defeated Västra Frölunda and returned to Allsvenskan.

In 1976 the club played its 100th game in Allsvenskan against GIF Sundsvall, however this ended with 9–2 defeat and led to manager Kay Wiestål being fired. The 1977 season became the club's most successful season so far; a group of companies sponsored the club's buying of Benno Magnusson; the club was able to end in 3rd place at the end of the season, earning the club its first medal.

In 1981 the club won its first title ever, by defeating IF Elfsborg with 4–0, the club won the Svenska Cupen for the first time ever, however they failed to stay in Allsvenskan and was relegated to Division 1; however the spell was only one year long and Kalmar returned in 1983.

1985 became the club's most successful season, as the club ended up in second place behind Örgryte IS and Billy Lansdowne and Peter Karlsson both became the league's top goalscorer along with Sören Börjesson, Örgryte IS, all scoring 10 goals each. The following year did not go as good; the club was relegated from the top league and the only happiness in 1987 was when the club yet again won the Cup title, this time against GAIS, however the club fell out of Division 1 this year.

In 1988 Kalmar FF won Division 2 without a single defeat which is a record in Division 2 and higher leagues. Between 1989 and 1997 the club spent most of its time in second highest league; this caused serious economic problems for the club.

The Brazilian era

After returning to Allsvenskan in 1998, but in 1999 the club fell out again, the only good thing was that the economy had been restored and was in good shape again. During the 2000 season club had to fight to avoid relegation from the second highest league and was only able to do it in the end of the season.

The goal of the 2001 season was to return to Allsvenskan again, after buying several new players such as Lasse Johansson, Fredrik Gärdeman and Lucas Nilsson, the club was able to return to Allsvenskan again, unfortunately the club was relegated directly. During the 2002 the first Brazilian, Alysson, arrived at the club.

The spell in Superettan 2003 became only one year as Kalmar won the league well ahead of Trelleborgs FF, purchase of Daniel Mendes and Dudu helped the club a lot.

In 2004 the club bought three new Brazilian players, Dedé Anderson, Fábio Augusto and César Santin, they all helped the club to a 5th place in Allsvenskan, just missing out on Royal League, the club also made a change board as chairman Ronny Nilsson left after 12 years at the helm, he was replaced by Tommy Strandman.

Champions

The two following seasons, 2005 and 2006, Kalmar ended up in 3rd and 5th respectively. Then in 2007 they made a great run from start to finish and finally ended up in second place after champions IFK Göteborg. They won Svenska Cupen the same year by beating IFK Göteborg with 3–0 at Fredriksskans in Kalmar.

Before the start, several Swedish experts believed that Kalmar FF would be one of the teams fighting for the championship title 2008, the club started the season stable and as the season went on the club performance became stronger and saw the club win many big victories, only other team able to keep up was IF Elfsborg. The club had to wait until the last match of the season against Halmstads BK in Halmstad before they could become champions. Before the final match Elfsborg was behind with 3 points and 9 goals. The match against Halmstads BK ended 2–2 placing the club 1 point ahead of Elfsborg. Patrik Ingelsten also became the league's top goalscorer of the season with 19 goals scored. The team reached the final in Svenska Cupen yet again and also this year against IFK Göteborg, however this year IFK won 5–4 on penalties after full-time and extra time had ended 0–0. The club also had the chance to reach the group stage of the UEFA Cup. After strong play against Racing FC from Luxembourg and Gent from Belgium, the club faced Dutch team Feyenoord, after winning 1–0 away in Rotterdam the club lost home with 1–2, in Borås at Borås Arena since Fredriksskans failed to reach UEFA demands, sending the club out of the competition on away goals.

Colours, crest and kit
The colours and kits have changed several times over the course of history. From its founding in 1910, Kalmar FF were striped green and red. In 1915 it was changed to red shirts and black shorts. After 1927 red-white striped shirt and red shorts. 1934-35 they returned to the red shirt and black shorts. In 1940, the red-and-white striped shirt and red shorts again. Full red shirt and white shorts, like today, Kalmar FF had for the first time in 1944. In 1952-56, as countless other Swedish clubs, they had the then popular Arsenal costume, with white sleeves.

Kit manufacturers and sponsors
The club's first kit manufacturer was Adidas, until a three-year deal was agreed with Umbro in 1995. Puma received the contract in 1998 and their sponsorship lasted for seventeen years. In 2016, Hummel was presented as the new kit manufacturer of the club.

European record
 Q = Qualifying round
UEFA Champions League

UEFA Cup / UEFA Europa League

UEFA Cup Winners' Cup

UEFA Club Coefficient Ranking
The following list ranks the current position of Kalmar FF in the UEFA ranking (as of 27 January 2017):

Players

Current squad

Out on loan

Retired numbers

Management

Board

Technical Staff

Managers

 Gustaf Andersson (1936–38)
 Gösta Carlsson (1938–44)
 Arne Rasmussen (1944)
 Gösta Carlsson (1945–49)
 Otto Cinadler (1946–47)
 Olle Ericsson (1949–50)
 István Wampetits (1951–55)
 Bert Turner (1955–56)
 István Wampetits (1956–58)
 Olle Ericsson (1958)
 Sune Andersson (1959–61)
 Gösta Carlsson (1962)
 Bertil Bäckvall (1963–66)
 Bertil Wennerström (1967–68)
 Jószef Kovács (1969)
 Lars Arnesson (Jan 1, 1970 – Dec 31, 1972)
 Bo Johansson (1973 – Dec 31, 1973)
 Göran Andersson (1974)
 Kay Wiestål (1975–76)
 Eivert Bladh (1976)
 Bo Johansson (1977–78)
 Bo Falk (1979–81)
 Bo Johansson (1982–83)
 Allan Hebo Larsen (Jan 1, 1984 – Dec 31, 1986)
 Jan Sjöström (1987)
 Göran Andersson (1987–88)
 Börje Axelsson (1988–90)
 Alf Westerberg (Jan 1, 1991 – Dec 31, 1992)
 Kalle Björklund (Jan 1, 1993 – Dec 31, 1993)
 Patrick Walker (Jan 1, 1994 – Aug 27, 1996)
 Kjell Nyberg (Aug 28, 1996 – Dec 31, 1997)
 Nanne Bergstrand (Jan 1, 1998 – Dec 31, 1999)
 Simon Hunt (Jan 1, 2000 – Sept 3, 2000)
 Ulf Ohlsson-Nordenhem (2000)
 Conny Karlsson (Sept 15, 2000 – Dec 31, 2002)
 Nanne Bergstrand (Jan 1, 2003 – Dec 31, 2013)
 Hans Eklund (Jan 1, 2014 – Nov 14, 2014)
 Peter Swärdh (Jan 1, 2015 – Jun 13, 2017)
 Nanne Bergstrand (Jun 13, 2017 – Jul 31, 2018)
 Henrik Rydström (Jul 31, 2018 – Nov 18, 2018)
 Magnus Pehrsson (Nov 27, 2018 – Oct 31 2019)
 Jens Nilsson (interim)
 Nanne Bergstrand (2020)
 Henrik Rydström (2021 - 2022)

Achievements
 Swedish Champions
 Winners (1): 2008

League
 Allsvenskan:
 Winners (1): 2008
 Runners-up (2): 1985, 2007
 Superettan:
 Winners (2): 2001, 2003
 Division 1 Södra:
 Winners (1): 1998
 Runners-up (1): 1994

Cups
 Svenska Cupen:
 Winners (3): 1980–81, 1986–87, 2007
 Runners-up (3): 1977–78, 2008, 2011
Svenska Supercupen:
 Winners (1): 2009
 Runners-up (1): 2008

Footnotes

References

External links
 Kalmar FF – official site
 Röda Bröder – supporter site

 
Football clubs in Kalmar County
Allsvenskan clubs
Sport in Kalmar
Association football clubs established in 1910
1910 establishments in Sweden
Svenska Cupen winners